They Came by Night is a 1940 British crime film directed by Harry Lachman and starring Will Fyffe, Phyllis Calvert and Anthony Hulme.  It was made at the Islington Studios by Gainsborough Pictures and released by 20th Century Fox. The film's sets were designed by the art director Alex Vetchinsky. It was based on the West End play of the same title by Barré Lyndon.

Synopsis
The screenplay concerns a man who is blackmailed into taking his brother's place in a gang for a jewellery heist.

Cast
 Will Fyffe as James Fothergill
 Phyllis Calvert as Sally
 Anthony Hulme as Sergeant Tolly
 George Merritt as Inspector Metcalfe
 Kathleen Harrison as Mrs. Lightbody
 John Glyn-Jones as Llewellyn Jones
 Athole Stewart as Lord Netfherly
 Cees Laseur as Vollaire
 Hal Walters as Hopkins
 Kuda Bux as Ali
 Leo Britt as George
 Sylvie St. Clair as Claire
 Wally Patch as Bugsie

References

External links

1940 films
1940 crime films
Films directed by Harry Lachman
British crime films
Films set in London
Gainsborough Pictures films
Islington Studios films
British films based on plays
20th Century Fox films
British black-and-white films
1940s English-language films
1940s British films